De Zerbi is a surname. People with the surname include:

 Jean-Marie De Zerbi (born 1959), French former footballer (mostly played for Brescia), now an assistant manager
 Roberto De Zerbi (born 1979), Italian former footballer (various Italian clubs), later manager for various clubs